Coleman Cruz Hughes (born February 25, 1996) is an American writer and podcast host. He was a fellow at the Manhattan Institute for Policy Research and a fellow and contributing editor at their City Journal, and is the host of the podcast Conversations with Coleman.

Early life and education
Hughes is of African American and Puerto Rican descent, and grew up in Montclair, New Jersey. He is a graduate of Newark Academy and was selected as a United States Presidential Scholar in 2014. He graduated from Columbia University in 2020 with a B.A. in philosophy.

Career
On June 19, 2019, Hughes testified before a U.S. House Judiciary subcommittee at a hearing on reparations for slavery, arguing against the campaign. He argued that "[i]f we were to pay reparations today, we would only divide the country further, making it harder to build the political coalitions required to solve the problems facing black people today." In this vein, he highlighted mass incarceration and high homicide victimization rates as problems affecting black Americans today. He suggested an alternate proposal of paying reparations to black Americans who personally grew up under Jim Crow. Hughes went on to say that reparations to the descendants of slaves would insult many black Americans and claimed they would make him and the "one-third of black Americans who poll against reparations into victims without their consent."

In addition to writing for Quillette, Hughes has contributed to publications including The Spectator, The New York Times, The Wall Street Journal, National Review, the Washington Examiner, and the Heterodox Academy blog. In May 2020, he became a fellow of the Manhattan Institute for Policy Research and contributing editor of their City Journal. Hughes is listed as a scholar for the 1776 Unites project. In February 2020, Hughes debated Julianne Malveaux on iHeartRadio's Munk Debates regarding the topic of slavery reparations.

Hughes is the host of the podcast Conversations with Coleman.

Views
Hughes says he formerly accepted the premise of Black Lives Matter—that, in his words, "racist cops are killing unarmed black people"—but now believes that the existence of racial bias in deadly shootings does not survive scrutiny once factors other than race are taken into account. He has cited research from Roland G. Fryer Jr. and Sendhil Mullainathan, among others, in support of his stance.

Hughes voted for Joe Biden in the 2020 United States presidential election.

Reception
Writing in The Washington Post in 2018, Megan McArdle called Hughes "an undergraduate at Columbia University but already a thinker to be reckoned with." Nick Gillespie wrote in Reason in 2019 that Hughes had "emerged over the past year as one of the most prolific and insightful commentators on race and class in the United States." In 2020, Christopher Bollen wrote in Interview that Hughes "has become one of the most compelling and promising voices on the political landscape." In September 2020, Stéphanie Chayet, writing in the French newspaper Le Monde, identified Hughes as one of four "anti-conformists of anti-racism" along with Glenn Loury, Thomas Chatterton Williams and John McWhorter. In December 2020, Hughes was listed on the Forbes 30-under-30 list for 2021 in the Media category.

Music
Hughes began studying violin at age three. He is a hobbyist rapper—in 2021 and 2022, he released several rap singles on YouTube and Spotify, using the moniker COLDXMAN, including a music video for a track titled "Blasphemy", which appeared in January 2022. Hughes also plays jazz trombone with a Charles Mingus tribute band that plays regularly at the Jazz Standard in New York City.

References

External links

 
 
 
 Congressional testimony
 Text, audio, and video of opening statement to Congress on reparations

1996 births
21st-century African-American people
African-American atheists
African-American non-fiction writers
American podcasters
Columbia College (New York) alumni
Living people
Newark Academy alumni
People from Montclair, New Jersey
Writers from New York City